L10 or L-10 may be:

Military
 HMS L10, a 1918 British L class submarine
 L10 Ranger Anti-Personnel mine, a British blast mine
 L 10, ASJA and Saab's internal designation for the Saab 17 1940s military aircraft
 L 10 Friedensengel, a variant of the World War II Blohm & Voss BV 950 torpedo
 USS L-10 (SS-50), an L-class submarine of the United States Navy

Transportation
 Cummins L10, a Cummins L Series diesel engine marketed from 1983 to 1997
 L.10 Electra, 1930s Lockheed airliner
 L10, development name for the 1930s Junkers Jumo 210 aircraft engine
 Scania-Vabis L10 (1944–1959), a series of trucks produced by Swedish automaker Scania-Vabis

Other uses
 Al Fajer L-10, a drone built by Start Aviation
 ISO/IEC 8859-16 (Latin-10), an 8-bit character encoding
 L10 life, the rate at which 10% of bearings are expected to fail
 Panasonic Lumix DMC-L10, a 2007 digital single-lens reflex camera

See also
 L10n
Magdeburger Startgerät, a missile, also known as the 10-L